"Sacré Charlemagne" is a song by France Gall. It was released in 1964 as a single, on an EP, and on an album, credited to "France Gall et ses petits amis".

According to the charts U.S. Billboard published in its "Hits of the World" section, the song reached no. 1 in France.

Lyrics 

The song’s lyrics were written by Robert Gall, the singer’s father.  They are about medieval emperor Charlemagne, traditionally seen as the "inventor of school", since education became mandatory for all children during his reign. Because of this the narrator of the song blames Charlemagne for having to go to school.

The song reflected contempt for studying among young people.

Reception 
The song was France Gall's first major success, selling over 2 million copies. In addition to reaching #1 on the French music charts, the song enjoyed international success, becoming a hit in Japan.
Its popularity endures as a French schoolchildren’s song.

Charts

See also 
 List of number-one singles of 1964 (France)
 List of number-one singles of 1965 (France)

References

External links 
  — INA archive

Songs about kings
Songs about emperors
Songs about military officers
Songs about school
1964 songs
France Gall songs
Number-one singles in France
1964 debut singles
Songs with lyrics by Robert Gall
Cultural depictions of Charlemagne